James Foster (c.1748 – 1823) was an English mason and architect in Bristol.

He was initially a pupil and apprentice of Thomas Paty, working both as a stonemason and an architect but from about 1800 his practice became entirely architectural.  He was later joined by his son James (d.1836), another son Thomas, a partner William Ignatius Okely and grandson John.

List of works of Foster and partners

James Foster or James Foster and son(s)
 Abergwili Palace, Carmarthen (1803)
 St James's Church, Mangotsfield (1812) alterations
 Brislington Church (1819) added north aisle
 Holy Trinity Church, Kingswood, Bristol (1819–1821)
 St Andrew's Church, Clifton, Bristol (1819–1822)
 Stapleton Church (1820)
 Meridian Place, Bristol (1822)
 City Market, St Nicholas Street, Bristol (1823)
 Upper and Lower Arcades, Bristol (1824)
 Former Anglican chapel in Shirehampton, burnt down in 1928 and replaced by present church (1827)

References
 H.M. Colvin, A Biographical Dictionary of British Architects, 1600-1840 (1997) 
 Andrew Foyle, Bristol, Pevsner Architectural Guides (2004) 
 Walter Ison, The Georgian Buildings of Bristol, Kingsmead Press (1978) 

19th-century English architects
1748 births
1823 deaths
Architects from Bristol